Joly Garbi (1913 – 9 December 2002) was a Greek actress. She was the wife of the actor Thodoros Moridis for 60 years. They had no descendants. In their late years they lived isolated from the public eye in their summer home in Mati.

She died in a nursing home, like her husband, and was buried in Marathon. Her death became known to the general public 10 days later. Thodoros Moridis died a year later, on December 22, 2003, at the age of 100.

Filmography

Cinema

Television

1989-90: Patir, yios kai pneuma (Father, son and the holy spirit)
1991-92:  Episkeptis tis omixlis
1993-94: Vanilla Chocolate (Βανίλια σοκολάτα), Mega
1997-98: Monachous-Monachous (Μονάχους-Μονάχους)

External links

1913 births
2002 deaths
Greek film actresses
Actresses from Athens
20th-century Greek actresses
South African emigrants to Greece